The Roman Catholic Diocese of San Jacinto is located in the town of Yaguachi, Ecuador.  It is a suffragan see to the Archdiocese of Guayaquil.

History
On 4 November 2009, Pope Benedict XVI established the Diocese of San Jacinto de Yaguachi from the Archdiocese of Guayaquil.

Ordinaries
Aníbal Nieto Guerra, O.C.D. (4 Nov 2009 – Present)

References

Roman Catholic dioceses in Ecuador
Roman Catholic Ecclesiastical Province of Guayaquil
Christian organizations established in 2009
Roman Catholic dioceses and prelatures established in the 21st century